Impfondo Airport  is an airport serving the city of Impfondo, Republic of the Congo.

The runway has an additional  of paved overrun on each end. East approach and departure will cross the Ubangi River, which is the international border with the Democratic Republic of the Congo.

Airlines and destinations

See also

 List of airports in the Republic of the Congo
 Transport in the Republic of the Congo

References

External links
OpenStreetMap - Impfondo
OurAirports - Impfondo

Airports in the Republic of the Congo